Bratnik  is a village in the administrative district of Gmina Kamionka, within Lubartów County, Lublin Voivodeship, in eastern Poland.

The village has a population of 99.

Exports

References

Bratnik